Stephanus Jacobus Naudé (born 1970) is a South African author and lawyer. He has written one novel and two compilations of short stories. 

After studying law at the University of Pretoria, Naudé practiced as a lawyer in New York and London before returning to South Africa to complete a master's degree in creative writing.

His debut book, The Alphabet of Birds (2013), was originally written in Afrikaans and has won several prizes including two University of Johannesburg Prizes and a South African Literary Award. He also received the 2014 Jan Rabie and Marjorie Wallace Writing Scholarship, the largest award for creative writing in South Africa. In 2015 Alfabet van die voels was published in English as The Alphabet of Birds by And Other Stories.

He currently lives in Cape Town, South Africa.

Awards 
 2012 South African Literary Awards First-time Published Author Award: Afrikaans for Alfabet van die voels
2012 University of Johannesburg Prize for Alfabet van die voëls
 2014 Jan Rabie and Marjorie Wallace Writing Scholarship
2018 University of Johannesburg Prize for Die derde spoel
 2019 Hertzog Prize for Die derde spoel

Works 

 (2015) The Alphabet of Birds. And Other Stories. 
 (2018) The Third Reel. Salt Publishing Ltd. 
 (2020) Mad Honey. Penguin Random House Publishing.

References

South African writers
21st-century South African lawyers
1970 births
Living people